Tiago Almeida may refer to:
 Tiago Almeida (footballer, born 1990)
 Tiago Almeida (footballer, born 2001)

See also
 Thiago Almeida (disambiguation)